Ceriel Oosthout (born 27 September 1984 in Deventer) is a Dutch footballer who currently plays for FC Hilversum in the Dutch third division.

Club career
He had a spell at Eerste Divisie side Go Ahead Eagles. His only previous club was SV Colmschate '33, where he played in the youth.

External Links / References
Voetbalnext- Ceriel Oosthout

1984 births
Living people
Footballers from Deventer
Go Ahead Eagles players
Eerste Divisie players
Association football midfielders
Dutch footballers
FC Hilversum players